Mike Law (born April 5, 1979 in Greenwood Village, Colorado) is a former lacrosse player who played for the Denver Outlaws of Major League Lacrosse and the Colorado Mammoth in the National Lacrosse League. Law was drafted in the fourth round in both the NLL and the MLL. He was a reserve player in the 2007 All-star game. Law graduated from the University of Denver Sturm College of Law on May 19, 2007. In 2008, Law was inducted into the Denver University Hall of Fame.

Statistics

NLL

MLL

Reference:

References

1979 births
Living people
American lacrosse players
Colorado Mammoth players
Greenwood Village, Colorado
National Lacrosse League All-Stars
University of Denver alumni